Tian Fengshan (born October 1940 in Zhaoyuan County, Heilongjiang) is a former Chinese politician who was convicted of corruption and sentenced to life in prison.

Biography
Tian became a member of the Communist Party of China (CPC) in 1970.

His positions include: Heilongjiang governor (February 1995), Minister of Land and Resources (March 2000). Tian was removed from this position in October 2003. In September 2004, the 4th plenary session of the CPC 16th National Congress announced Investigation Report on Tian Fengshan by Central Commission for Discipline Inspection of CPC, and decided to deprive Tian of the membership of CPC Central Committee and expel him from the Party. On December 27, 2005, charged with bribery, Tian was given a life sentence by the Beijing Second Intermediate People's Court, with life-time political privileges being removed and all his personal belongings confiscated. 

Tian was an alternate member of the 14th Central Committee of Communist Party of China, and a full member of the 15th and 16th Central Committees.

External links
Biography on Chinatoday.com
 Biography of Tian Fengshan, Xinhuanet.
 Tian Fengshan podrá suicidarse gracias a la benevolencia del Pueblo, El Catoblepas.

1940 births
Living people
People from Daqing
People's Republic of China politicians from Heilongjiang
Ministers of Land and Resources of China
Chinese Communist Party politicians from Heilongjiang
Governors of Heilongjiang
Chinese politicians convicted of corruption